Kryukovo is a district of Zelenogradsky Administrative Okrug in the federal city of Moscow, Russia. Population:

History
It was formerly a village in Solnechnogorsky District of Moscow Oblast.

Kryukovo was where German forces came the closest to Moscow (41 km) during World War II. Now several monuments are located in Kryukovo and in the surrounding area.

Transportation
The main railway station in Zelenograd is also called Kryukovo.

References

Zelenograd
Districts of Moscow